The Turf, Field and Farm was a New York journal  of turf and field sports founded in 1865 by Sanders D. Bruce, and published until 1903.  The nucleus of the original magazine was formed with assets purchased from the struggling Spirit of the Times magazine.

After the Civil War The Turf, Field and Farm was one of the three leading newspapers in New York City. Two of the three were mainly devoted to horse racing, the other being Spirit of the Times.

References

Defunct magazines published in the United States
English-language magazines
Magazines established in 1865
Magazines disestablished in 1903
Magazines published in New York (state)
Sports magazines published in the United States